Rasoul Amani (born 1 December 1964 in Tehran, Iran) is an Iranian-New Zealander wrestler who represented New Zealand in Graeco-Roman wrestling in the 63 kg class at the 2000 Summer Olympics; see Wrestling at the 2000 Summer Olympics.

External links
Rasoul Amani at New Zealand Olympic Committee
Rasoul Amani at Sports Reference

References
Black Gold by Ron Palenski (2008, 2004 New Zealand Sports Hall of Fame, Dunedin) 

1964 births
Living people
Olympic wrestlers of New Zealand
Wrestlers at the 2000 Summer Olympics
New Zealand male sport wrestlers
Iranian emigrants to New Zealand
Olympic competitors from Iran who represented other countries
20th-century New Zealand people
21st-century New Zealand people
20th-century Iranian people
21st-century Iranian people